Reginald "Reggie" Long is a fictional character in publications by DC Comics. He is the second character to hold the name of Rorschach and was introduced in the 2017 series Doomsday Clock by Geoff Johns and Gary Frank.

Publication history
The character first appeared under the Rorschach identity in the first issue of Doomsday Clock but his name was not revealed until issue four.

Fictional character biography
Reggie Long is the son of Dr. Malcolm Long, a psychiatrist who examined Walter Kovacs, the original Rorschach. It is revealed that Reggie's parents were killed when Veidt's monster was teleported to New York, resulting in Reggie going insane from the trauma inflicted by said monster. Reggie ends up at the same Maine mental institution as the former Minuteman Byron Lewis, who becomes his friend and teaches him self-defense techniques, allowing Reggie to learn and ultimately master the fighting techniques of every member of the Minutemen. Byron briefly escapes the institution to fly to New York and retrieve Dr. Long's personal effects to smuggle back to Reggie. Included in these items are Long's case notes on Kovacs, leading Reggie to eventually adopt Kovacs' moniker and mannerisms. Meanwhile, Veidt's intended utopia crumbles and the world once again stands on the brink of nuclear war when the contents of Kovacs' journal are publicized. Reggie escapes the institution and begrudgingly teams up with Veidt to seek out Doctor Manhattan and convince him to save their world. To this end, Rorschach II breaks two costumed criminals, Erika Manson, a.k.a. The Marionette, and Marcos Maez, a.k.a. The Mime, out of prison.

The four use the Owlship to follow Manhattan to the DC Universe just as war breaks out on their Earth. Rorschach II finds himself in Gotham City, where he goes to Wayne Manor and manages to find the Batcave. Upon being confronted by Batman, Rorschach II urges him to read Kovacs' journal and read about Veidt's past deeds. After allowing him to spend the night at Wayne Manor, Batman claims to have tracked Manhattan to Arkham Asylum and brings along Rorschach II. However, it is revealed that Batman, having figured that Rorschach II is insane upon reading the journal, has tricked him into coming to the asylum and leaves him in a cell to be treated. During his stay at Arkham, Rorschach II is interviewed by a psychiatrist named Matthew Mason, whom he refuses to speak to. After reliving painful memories of his past and his first meeting with Adrian Veidt (whom he intended to assassinate), he is released by another inmate who is revealed to be Saturn Girl. It is then revealed that Mason was actually Bruce Wayne in an elaborate disguise, attempting to learn more about Rorschach II.

After the revelation by Doctor Manhattan that Veidt doesn't have cancer as well as the resulting revelation by Veidt that he lied while pretending to be overcome by regret and remorse as he needed Rorschach II's help and that Walter Kovacs was not a friend of Malcolm Long but broke him down, Rorschach II violently reacts and repeatedly punches Veidt and then the Joker before proclaiming that "Rorschach is dead" and throwing his mask on the ground. Earlier, Rorschach II was going to kill Veidt, but he didn't as he thought that Veidt had changed while dying from cancer. Rorschach II also previously believed that Walter Kovacs and Malcolm Long were friends.

Reception
Mike Fugere of Comic Book Resources criticized the character for being too "comic booky" and "diminish[ing] Rorschach’s complexity, to a certain degree", but also found him "sympathetic and likable" and, overall, "a great character". Eric Francisco of Inverse thought that the character brought "welcome diversity" but also added "new dimensions" to Rorschach, as the identity change allowed Watchmen "to participate in what’s become tradition in mainstream superhero comics", a superhero inheriting the mantle of another.

See also
 List of DC Comics characters
 List of fictional antiheroes
 List of Doomsday Clock characters

References

External links

DC Comics male superheroes
Characters created by Geoff Johns
Comics characters introduced in 2017
African-American superheroes
Vigilante characters in comics
Watchmen characters